Jean-François Gerbillon (4 June 1654, Verdun, France – 27 March 1707, Peking, China) was a French missionary who worked in China.

He entered the Society of Jesus, 5 Oct, 1670, and after completing the usual course of study taught grammar and humanities for seven years. His long-cherished desire to labor in the missions of the East was gratified in 1685, when he joined the group of Jesuits who had been chosen to found the French mission in China. For the first leg of the trip, he was attached to the embassy of the Chevalier de Chaumont to Siam, and was accompanied by a group of Jesuit mathematicians (Jean de Fontaney (1643–1710), Joachim Bouvet (1656–1730), Louis Le Comte (1655–1728), Guy Tachard (1648–1712) and Claude de Visdelou (1656–1737)). Tachard would remain in Siam besides King Narai, but the others would reach China in 1687.

Upon their arrival in Beijing they were received by the Kangxi Emperor who was favorably impressed by them and retained Gerbillion and Joachim Bouvet at the court. This famous monarch realized the value of the services which the fathers could render to him owing to their scientific attainments, and they on their part were glad in this way to win his favour and gain prestige in order to further the interests of the infant mission.

As soon as they had learned the language of the country, Gerbillion with Thomas Pereira, one of his companions, was sent as interpreter to Nerchinsk with the ambassadors commissioned to treat with the Russians regarding the boundaries of the two empires, which were determined in the Treaty of Nerchinsk (1689). This was but the beginning of his travels, during which he was often attached to the suite of the emperor. He made eight different journeys into "Tartary" (i.e., Manchuria and Mongolia). On one of these he was an eyewitness to the campaign in which Kangxi defeated the Oirats. On his last journey he accompanied the three commissioners who regulated public affairs and established new laws among the Khalkha Mongols, who had yielded allegiance to the emperor. He availed himself of this opportunity to determine the latitude and longitude of a number of places in what is today the Northeastern China and adjacent areas of Russia and Mongolia.

Gerbillion was for a time in charge of the French college in Beijing, and afterwards became superior-general of the mission. He enjoyed the special friendship and esteem of the emperor, who had a high opinion of his ability and frequently availed himself of his scientific and diplomatic services. He was withal a zealous missionary, and in 1692 obtained an edict granting the free exercise of the Christian religion. After the emperor's recovery from a fever, during which he was attended by Gerbillion and Bouvet, he showed his gratitude by bestowing on them a site for a chapel and residence.

Gerbillion was a skilled linguist. He was the author of several works on mathematics, and wrote an account of his travels in Tatary. These relations are valuable for their accurate account of the typography of the country, the customs of the people, and also for the details of life of the missionaries at the court. Additionally, his writings, which documented foreign fauna, were important for studies in natural history, and even veterinary medicine.

Works

"Eléments de Géométrie" (1689), "Géométrie pratique et théoretique" (1690), "Eléments de philosophie". "Relations du huit Voyages dans la Grande Tartarie" (Un autre nom — "Relations de huit voyages en Tartarie faits par ordre de l'empereur de Chine", 1688–98), "Observations historiques sur la grande Tartarie". A work entitled "Elementa Linguæ Tartaricæ" is also attributed to him.

References

1654 births
1707 deaths
People from Verdun
French Roman Catholic missionaries
17th-century French Jesuits
Jesuit missionaries in China
18th-century French Jesuits
Roman Catholic missionaries in China
French expatriates in China